Pál Losonczi (born Pál Laklia; 18 September 191928 March 2005) was a Hungarian communist political figure. He was Chairman of the Hungarian Presidential Council (i.e., titular head of state) from 1967 to 1987.

Honours 
  Empire of Iran : Commemorative Medal of the 2500th Anniversary of the founding of the Persian Empire (14/10/1971).
  : Knight Grand Collar of the Order of Prince Henry (14/08/1979).

References 

1919 births
2005 deaths
People from Somogy County
Hungarian Communist Party politicians
Members of the Hungarian Working People's Party
Members of the Hungarian Socialist Workers' Party
Presidents of Hungary
Agriculture ministers of Hungary
Members of the National Assembly of Hungary (1953–1958)
Members of the National Assembly of Hungary (1958–1963)
Members of the National Assembly of Hungary (1963–1967)
Members of the National Assembly of Hungary (1967–1971)
Members of the National Assembly of Hungary (1971–1975)
Members of the National Assembly of Hungary (1975–1980)
Members of the National Assembly of Hungary (1980–1985)
Members of the National Assembly of Hungary (1985–1990)
Grand Collars of the Order of Prince Henry
People from Barcs